Ex on the Beach is an American reality television series, based on the British series of the same name. The series was announced on March 15, 2018 and premiered on MTV on Thursday, April 19.

Production
The first four seasons of the series were hosted by rapper Romeo Miller.

On March 10, 2022, the series was renewed for a fifth and a sixth season, with the fifth season premiering later that month, on March 31, 2022.

In April 2022, MTV released a casting call for a new season, and also announced a new format for the show, featuring real life couples for the first time. The sixth season, titled Ex on the Beach Couples: Now or Never (hosted by Kamie Crawford) premiered on February 9, 2023.

Series overview

Cast

References

External links

2010s American reality television series
2018 American television series debuts
2020s American reality television series
American television series based on British television series
English-language television shows
Ex on the Beach
MTV reality television series
Television shows set in California
Television shows set in Hawaii